Reynolds "Ren" Shultz (August 4, 1921 – January 24, 2000) was an American politician. He was the 37th Lieutenant Governor of Kansas from 1971 to 1973, having previously served in the Kansas Senate since 1965. He served in the United States Marine Corps in World War II.

References

1921 births
2000 deaths
Republican Party Kansas state senators
Lieutenant Governors of Kansas
People from Jefferson County, Kansas
United States Marines
United States Marine Corps personnel of World War II
20th-century American politicians